Flight Lieutenant William James Green (23 April 1917 – 7 November 2014) was a British Battle of Britain Fighter pilot, who served with the RAF. Flight Lieutenant Green flew Hawker Hurricanes for 9 days during the Battle of Britain, between 20 and 29 August 1940. During that time he was shot down twice: the first time on 24 August 1940, crash landing at Hawkinge and the second time on 29 August over Deal in Kent.

Royal Air Force
Green joined the Royal Auxiliary Air Force as an engine fitter in December 1936, and later trained as a pilot. On joining No. 501 Squadron RAF on 19 August 1940, Green had flown only about 5 hours on Hurricanes and had only flown one for the first time the day before but was sent into action regardless on 20 August 1940. Green considers himself to have been one of the least trained pilots during the Battle of Britain and lucky to have survived.

The first thing Green knew of being shot down on 29 August 1940 was a large hole appearing in his armoured windscreen and he never saw the aircraft that shot him down. He managed to exit his aircraft but his parachute initially failed to open as his drogue parachute lines had been cut about nine inches above where they joined the main parachute. His boots were ripped off his feet during the ensuing high-speed fall and he remembers quite clearly wondering whether his wife of 12 weeks, Bertha, would wonder whether he had wondered what it would feel like to "hit the deck". Bill had resigned himself that this was the end, but just as he neared the treetops, the parachute eventually opened without the drogue and he landed almost immediately in a farm in Elham Valley near Folkestone only to discover that he couldn't stand as he had been wounded in the leg:

He continued to serve in the RAF, rising from the rank of Sergeant Pilot to Flight Lieutenant.

Later life

Prior to retirement Bill Green Was Chairman and managing director of Reed International and Crown Paints respectively a high respected Boss, who knew everyone who worked at the Darwen Plant of Crown Paints, Bill was a gentleman - a true hero - never one to blow his own trumpet or seek celebrity status Sadly Missed by all who knew and had the pleasure to work with him.  As a Mark of Respect a 2 minutes Silence was held on the day of his Funeral and the Union Flag was at half mast over Crown House in Darwen.  A giant of a man highly respected.

Bill Green resided for the final years of his life in the Bristol area, and was one of the last remaining members of The Few. He was involved with many ex service charity's - the Royal Air Forces Association - and the Local & County Air Cadets Organization - he was RAF through and through. He died on 7 November 2014, aged 97.

References

External links
http://www.bbc.co.uk/news/uk-11025959
http://www.bbc.co.uk/news/10553690
https://web.archive.org/web/20150923224743/http://www.bristolpost.co.uk/Farewell-heroic-Bristol-pilot/story-24517115-detail/story.html

Royal Air Force officers
The Few
2014 deaths
1917 births
Royal Air Force pilots of World War II
Military personnel from Bristol